Kinship Part 2 (Simplified Chinese: 手足第二部, 手足續集) is a Singaporean Chinese long running drama which was televised on Singapore's free-to-air channel, MediaCorp TV Channel 8 every Monday to Friday at 19:00. It made its debut on 17 December 2007. The drama is the second of two parts.

This drama series consists of a cast which aims to appeal to both younger and older audience. As such, the producers have cited this drama as a highly anticipated drama, comparable to the likes of Holland V, Double Happiness and Portrait of Home. This drama is the longest running drama (with 40 episodes) being produced by MediaCorp in 2007.

Cast

Plot
Yusheng is given the death sentence and Meiqi desperately seeks ways and means to exonerate her. As Anping's whereabouts is still unknown, Meiqi has no choice but to hand the foot reflexology business to Naifa but the latter is not only incapable of managing the business, he also gets into more trouble.

To obtain evidence that can help exonerate Yusheng, Anping has no choice but to give in to Lishi. Yusheng is eventually acquitted and marries Yingjun. Lishi buys over half the foot reflexology business as a direct challenge to Meiqi. Devastated and heartbroken, Meiqi decides to pull out from the love triangle.

A rich middle-aged businessman Li Zhongshang is impressed with Meiqi's kindness and magnanimity and decides to woo her. Even though Anping is with Lishi, he still cannot forget Meiqi; thus, the relationship among the four becomes even more complicated.

Yinsha faces tremendous difficulty in her career when she is charged with selling fake medicine, and this drives her to depression. Jinsha's marriage also enters into troubled waters when she finds out about Naifa's adulterous affair with Daisy.

Chang Yin is lucky to survive the murder attempt but he assumes a new identity as Zixin, a private investigator. Through various investigation tactics, he attempts to bring to Yusheng's knowledge Shuiling and Martin's despicable schemes, and at the same time, re-build their bond as father and daughter.

To seize control of Da Ying Jia, Shuiling forges the legal assets authorization documents. Although everyone is suspicious, there is nothing they can do about it. With the constant fear that Meixue may wake up one day to expose her evil deeds, and under repeated instigation by Martin, Shuiling and Martin end Meixue's life.

Anxin also survives the ordeal and returns as a Thai monk with the fervent hope to lead Shuiling to repentance. Shuiling however decides that there is no turning back and plans to embezzle large funds from Da Ying Jia with Martin. Yingjun decides to sue them when he discovers the embezzlement scheme and the forgery of the legal documents.

Martin plans to flee even as Shuiling goes berserk. Wenya's life is in danger when she accidentally learns what they have done…

Viewership
Following the disappointing viewership and reviews for Part 1 of this drama, Part 2 carried on to be a let down, recording one of the lowest viewership ratings for the year 2007.

References

External links
Kinship II theme song
Kinship official website
Character profile

Kinship (TV series)
2007 Singaporean television seasons
2008 Singaporean television seasons